Milan Borjan (born 23 October 1987) is a professional soccer player who plays as a goalkeeper for Red Star Belgrade and the Canadian national team.

Early life
Borjan was born on 23 October 1987 in Knin, SFR Yugoslavia, to ethnic Serb parents Boško and Mirjana (née Jadrić). Borjan got his first taste of organized football in the town, playing with the Dinara Knin youth side. Borjan's family lived in Knin until Operation Storm in 1995, at which point his family fled to Belgrade, and Borjan began playing soccer with FK Radnički Beograd. In 2000, the family emigrated to Canada, first living in Winnipeg, Manitoba for a few months, before settling in Hamilton, Ontario where his parents still reside. He attended Glendale Secondary School. He played youth soccer in Canada with East Hamilton SC for six months, before joining Mount Hamilton SC.

Club career

Early career
Borjan went on trial with Boca Juniors in 2005, but failed to sign a contract with the club. In 2006, he joined Club Nacional de Football in Montevideo, Uruguay, playing for their youth team, and in July 2007, he went on trial with the Argentine club Club Atlético River Plate. His final South American stint was with Quilmes, with whom he played from January 2008 through the end of the 2007–08 Primera B Nacional season.

Rad
Borjan returned to Serbia in January 2009, signing with the Belgrade Serbian SuperLiga club FK Rad. He initially had difficulty breaking into the team, signed as the third-string goalkeeper. However, due to trouble with the starting keeper's work permits, and an injury from the second string, Borjan soon became the only available goalkeeper on the club roster. He made his debut on 16 August 2009 in a 3–2 victory over FK Smederevo. By fall 2010, he was the starting keeper, with a nine-game winning streak. Under his tenure, FK Rad became fourth in the league, gaining them a berth in the 2011–12 UEFA Europa League qualifying rounds.

Sivasspor
Following an appearance in the 2011 CONCACAF Gold Cup, Borjan joined the Turkish club Sivasspor, and made his debut on 11 September 2011 in a 2–1 loss against Karabükspor.

Loan to Vaslui
Due to a lack of playing time in Turkey, Borjan was loaned to Romanian club SC Vaslui in a deal that would keep him in Romania through the end of the season, with an option to purchase the player for an undisclosed transfer fee. Borjan joined the club as the starting goalkeeper and played seven clean sheet games in 16 starts, securing Vaslui a spot in the UEFA Champions League.

Return to Sivasspor

After returning from a successful stint in Romania, Borjan returned to the starting lineup in the third match of the 2012–13 season in a 0–0 draw against Fenerbahçe on 2 September 2012. In February 2014, following a decrease in playing time under new manager Roberto Carlos, Borjan's contract with Sivasspor was terminated. Speculation arose, after the termination, that a deal had been put in place for Borjan to join Napoli in June, as the Turkish Football Association blocked a January move.

Ludogorets Razgrad
Following reports that he had signed for Bosnian Premier League club Sarajevo as a free agent, Borjan accepted an offer from Bulgarian club PFC Ludogorets Razgrad on 12 September 2014. The club had already qualified for the 2014–15 UEFA Champions League group stage, and four days after signing, Borjan made his club debut in a 2–1 Champions League away defeat to Liverpool F.C. That game marked the first time that a Canadian international played in the group stage since Lars Hirschfeld played with Rosenborg BK in 2007. Razgrad released Borjan shortly thereafter, having secured first-choice goalkeeper Vladislav Stoyanov through the summer of 2015.

Radnički Niš
Spurning interest from Sarajevo, Borjan signed a one-year contract with SuperLiga club FK Radnički Niš on 15 February 2015. Due to his Serbian passport, Borjan did not count as a foreigner while playing at Radnički. He debuted in a 0–0 draw against Red Star Belgrade on 23 February, the first of three clean sheets in a row.

Return to Ludogorets Razgrad
Borjan turned down a contract to return to Radnički, instead returning to the Bulgarian A Football Group of Ludogorets, where he signed a three-year deal on 2 June 2015. Although he was signed as the second-string goalkeeper, Borjan began to start after Stoyanov sustained a major injury.

Loan to Corona Kielce
On 15 February 2017, Borjan was loaned to the Ekstraklasa club Korona Kielce through the end of the season, where he made 14 league appearances and five clean sheets.

Red Star Belgrade

Three years after rumors of a transfer to Red Star Belgrade, Borjan made the transfer official, replacing Filip Manojlović on 24 July 2017. Borjan signed a three-year contract with the club and chose the jersey number 82. He made his debut in the first leg of the third qualifying round for the 2017–18 UEFA Europa League, keeping a clean sheet in a home victory against Sparta Prague on 27 July 2017. He played his first eternal derby with the club a month later.

In his second season with the club, Borjan would help Red Star qualify for the 2018–19 UEFA Champions League, and would earn two clean sheets: once in the group stage opener against Napoli, and again in a 2–0 home win against Liverpool. In February 2019, Zvezdan Terzić announced that Borjan would sign a contract extension until 2023, and would finish his career after that. He was honoured by Red Star shortly after as the club athlete of the year.

On 23 May 2022 Borjan notably scored a penalty for Red Star in their final game of the 2021–22 Serbian SuperLiga against Voždovac, as the club clinched their fifth-straight title. In July 2022, despite earlier talk of retirement after his current deal ended, Borjan signed a contract extension until 2026.

International career

Borjan was called to join the Canada national team in 2010, following strong performances with FK Rad. He was called up to the Canadian senior team on 3 February 2011, and made his team debut in an exhibition game against Greece a week later. That summer, Borjan was called up to the 2011 CONCACAF Gold Cup roster, making his Gold Cup debut on 11 June 2011 in a 1–0 victory over Guadeloupe at Raymond James Stadium. He also recorded his first national team game on home soil at BMO Field on 1 June 2011 in an exhibition against Ecuador that ended in a 2–2 draw.

Due to the suspension of first choice goalkeeper Lars Hirschfeld, Borjan started in the 0:0 home draw against Honduras in a 2014 FIFA World Cup qualifier on 12 June 2012. Since the end of 2012, Borjan has been Canada's starting goalkeeper, named to the final squad in the 2013, 2017, and 2019 CONCACAF Gold Cup. He earned his first red card for Canada on 11 June 2015 in a 2018 World Cup qualifying match, handling the ball outside the box after a mistake from Julian de Guzman.

Borjan remained Canada's starting goalkeeper for the 2022 FIFA World Cup qualifiers. During this campaign, he played a crucial role in one of Canada's best ever results, making a goal-line save to keep Canada in the lead during stoppage time in a 2-1 victory over Mexico in Edmonton, Canada's first win against Mexico in 21 years. He also kept a clean sheet against the United States in a 2–0 victory in Hamilton, Ontario, after which he was named by Canada Soccer as Canada's player of the month for January. On November 13, 2022, Borjan was named to Canada's squad for the 2022 FIFA World Cup.

Personal life
Borjan is married to Snežana Filipović, a former marketing director of FK Partizan and sister of Nenad Filipović. He has a younger brother, Nikola, who is also a goalkeeper in the Red Star system.

Career statistics

Club

International

Honours

SC Vaslui
Liga I runner-up: 2011–12

Ludogorets
Bulgarian First League: 2014–15, 2015–16

Red Star Belgrade
Serbian SuperLiga: 2017–18, 2018–19, 2019–20, 2020–21, 2021–22
Serbian Cup: 2020–21, 2021–22

Individual
Serbian SuperLiga Team of the Season: 2018–19

References

External links

 
 
 Milan Borjan stats at Utakmica.rs 
 

1987 births
Living people
Association football goalkeepers
Sportspeople from Knin
Canadian soccer players
Canada men's international soccer players
Serbian footballers
Serbs of Croatia
Yugoslav Wars refugees
Refugees in Serbia
Serb diaspora sportspeople
Naturalized citizens of Canada
Naturalized citizens of Serbia
Serbian people of Croatian descent
Canadian people of Serbian descent
Canadian people of Croatian descent
Canadian expatriate soccer players
Expatriate footballers in Uruguay
Canadian expatriate sportspeople in Uruguay
Expatriate footballers in Argentina
Canadian expatriate sportspeople in Argentina
Expatriate footballers in Turkey
Canadian expatriate sportspeople in Turkey
Expatriate footballers in Bulgaria
Canadian expatriate sportspeople in Bulgaria
Expatriate footballers in Poland
Canadian expatriate sportspeople in Poland
Club Nacional de Football players
Boca Juniors footballers
Club Atlético River Plate footballers
Quilmes Atlético Club footballers
FK Rad players
Sivasspor footballers
FC Vaslui players
PFC Ludogorets Razgrad players
FK Radnički Niš players
Korona Kielce players
Red Star Belgrade footballers
Serbian SuperLiga players
Süper Lig players
First Professional Football League (Bulgaria) players
Second Professional Football League (Bulgaria) players
Ekstraklasa players
2011 CONCACAF Gold Cup players
2013 CONCACAF Gold Cup players
2017 CONCACAF Gold Cup players
2019 CONCACAF Gold Cup players
2022 FIFA World Cup players